Granite City is a city in Madison County, Illinois, United States, within the Greater St. Louis metropolitan area. The population was 27,549 at the 2020 census, making it the third-largest city in the Metro East and Southern Illinois regions, behind Belleville and O'Fallon. Officially founded in 1896, Granite City was named by the Niedringhaus brothers, William and Frederick, who established it as a steel making company town for the manufacture of graniteware kitchen utensils.

History

Early settlement
The area was settled much earlier than Granite City's official founding. In the early 19th century, settlers began to farm the rich fertile grounds to the east of St. Louis. Around 1801, the area saw the establishment of Six Mile Settlement, a farming area that occupied the area of present-day Granite City, six miles (10 km) from St. Louis. Soon after, around 1806, the National Road was to be constructed through the area, but it was never completed. By 1817, the area became known as Six Mile Prairie, to distinguish it from Six Mile Township. By 1854, the first railroad was built. In 1856, the area known as Six Mile would be changed to Kinder.

Granite ware
Granite City was founded in 1896 to be a planned company city similar to Pullman, Illinois, by German immigrant brothers Frederick G. and William Niedringhaus for their Granite ware kitchen supplies factory.

Since 1866, the brothers had been operating the St. Louis Stamping Company, an iron works company, that made kitchen utensils in St. Louis, Missouri. In the 1870s, William discovered an enamelware process in Europe whereby metal utensils could be coated with enamel to make them lighter and more resistant to oxidation.  At the time, most enamelware was usually just one color as the additions of any colors to the process was inefficient. On June 1, 1878, William applied for Patent 207543 to improve the efficiency whereby a pattern could be applied to enamelware while the enamel was still wet simply by placing a thin piece of paper with an oxidized pattern on top of it.  The paper would fall off in the drying process and the pattern was embedded.  The brothers' pattern made the utensils resemble granite. The resulting product was enormously popular.

The brothers opened the Granite Iron Rolling Mills in St. Louis to provide tin (imported from Wales) to its prospering kitchen supplies manufacturer.  The imported tin had a $22 per ton tariff.

Frederick ran for Congress in Missouri in 1888.  During his one term in the 51st Congress, he successfully urged the passage of a new tariff of 50 percent of value on imported iron and tin. With the increased tariff, the U.S. steel industry (including their iron plant) took off.

As they planned expansion of their Bessemer process steel works, they were blocked by the city of St. Louis which did not want the expansion. As well, the Terminal Railroad Association of St. Louis planned to tax coal crossing the Mississippi River into Missouri.

Company town
In 1891, the brothers bought  from business tycoon Lars Kovala.  This land extended from the Mississippi River across the Chicago, Burlington and Quincy Railroad tracks for their new Granite City.

With the help of the St. Louis City Engineer, a street grid was laid out with streets listed in alphabetic order plus numbered streets, and the only exception being Niedringhaus Avenue.

The Niedringhaus family required that its employees live in the town.  Houses were purchased with Niedringhaus mortgages.  Unlike Pullman, however, they did not exert major control over the day-to-day lives of their employees and left the government of the city up to the residents.

African-Americans were not allowed in the community and instead congregated in Brooklyn, Illinois.

The plant would later grow to occupy  and employ more than 4,000 people. The plant prospered until the 1950s when aluminum, stainless steel, and pyrex replaced iron-based utensils.

The granite pattern in kitchen utensils, particularly in roasting pans, remains very popular.

Early history
In 1896, Granite City was officially incorporated as a City within Madison County, Illinois. The first seven years went as planned with rapid growth. Henry Fossiek was hired as the first policeman, a School Board of Directors was appointed by the Mayor, four schools opened, the 1st Church of the Concordian Lutheran Church was built, Stamping Company changed its name to National Enameling & Stamping Company (NESCO), and lots were sold for a new subdivision to be named ‘Granite Park’ (More commonly known as West Granite, today). Then in 1903, a massive flood covered all of West Granite while the rest of the town stayed relatively dry.

In 1906, ten thousand persons emigrated to Granite City from Macedonia, Bulgaria, Hungary and other parts of Central and Eastern Europe, during a two-year period. The majority of these immigrants, primarily those from the country of Hungary, moved to present-day Lincoln Place. At the time, this area was called ‘Hungary Hollow’. During the Panic of 1907, the neighborhood of Hungary Hollow was nicknamed ‘Hungry Hollow’, as many immigrants starved during this period. The following year, one of the founding fathers of the city and of NESCO, William Niedringhaus, would die, leading to the beginning of a new era in both the company and the city's future.

It was also during this period that St. Joseph Catholic Church was organized and a canal and levee system were built. Methody Bulgarian Church in America was built in Hungary Hollow for the large number of Macedonians and Bulgarians living there. At the time, Granite City had the largest concentration of Bulgarians in the country and boasted the only American newspaper printed in the Bulgarian language.

After the 1915 Armenian Genocide in the Ottoman Empire, thousands of Armenians fled Western Armenia and migrated to the United States. The promise of jobs at steel mills in Granite City created a thriving Armenian community in the town, with many Armenians settling in Lincoln Place. Since then, they have kept a church and community center, along with the Granite City "Antranig" Chapter of the Armenian Youth Federation.

Around 1903, Granite City expelled its African American residents. In 1967, the Congress of Racial Equality alleged that Granite City was a sundown town. Mayor Donald Partney acknowledged that the city was commonly understood to have a sundown ordinance but denied that it was official.

2000s history
As of 2008, several large manufacturing corporations operate in the city, including U.S. Steel, Precoat Metals, Capri-Sun, Kraft Foods, Heidtman Steel, Prairie Farms, and American Steel. The clothing retailer Glik's is also headquartered in Granite City. In July 2018, President Donald Trump visited the city to deliver a speech about industry growth at the U.S Steel plant.

Geography
Granite City is located at  (38.717849, -90.129529), adjacent to the Chain of Rocks Canal on the Upper Mississippi River, bordering Horseshoe Lake on its southeastern side. The city sits in the American Bottom, a wide, flat and fertile plain. Although at risk during the Great Flood of 1993, the city never flooded and is protected by a series of levees along both the Mississippi River and Chain of Rocks Canal.

Granite City is located within a few miles of five interstate highways. Interstate 270 passes through the northern edge of the city and Interstates 255, 70, 55, and 64 all pass just to the south and east of the city.

Route 3 is a major thoroughfare along the western edge of the city and provides access to downtown St. Louis across the recently renovated McKinley Bridge.

Cityscape

Granite City can be divided into eight areas: Downtown, East Granite, West Granite, North Granite, Nameoki Strip, Bellemore Area and the Wilson Park Area. Most retailers and dining facilities are located on the Nameoki Strip, surrounding Nameoki Road.

The Wilson park area is home to the recently renovated Coolidge Middle School, former Niedringhaus Elementary School, and Granite City High School as well as the city's crown jewel, Wilson Park. Wilson Park is sometimes called the "heart" of Granite City and is known for its nicely kept "turn of the [20th] century" homes.

East Granite is less defined, but is mostly modern residential subdivisions as well as both St. Elizabeth and Holy Family Catholic Schools. East Granite is north of the blast furnace at US Steel.  US Steel's complex was formerly known as the Granite City Steel Co.

Downtown is at the southwestern part of the city and is home to much of the city's industry, including the Granite City Steel Works. Downtown Granite suffered a downturn in the 1970s, which vacated much of its commercial buildings and in turn, urban decay began. More recently, there have been revitalization efforts to revive the downtown area, although they are still in their early stages. These efforts are modeled on nearby cities such as Belleville, IL, Edwardsville, IL, and St. Charles, MO. Revitalization efforts include installing tree-filled medians on Niedringhaus Avenue, adding recreational businesses such as the three-screen Granite City Theater, repaving streets, granting tax incentives, and adding new zoning restrictions. The original design of what is currently downtown Granite City is based on the City of Washington D.C.

West Granite is located west of downtown across the railroad lines. West Granite contains both industrial and lower income residential areas and has been struggling to fight its above average crime rate. While Wilson Park may be the Heart of Granite City, West Granite is the History. Attracted by the promise of plentiful jobs, many immigrants from Central-Eastern Europe, primarily Bulgaria, Macedonia and Hungary, migrated to the City in search of good jobs with decent wages. The vast majority of these immigrants settled into housing to the west of the downtown area in a place that would come to be known as ‘Hungary Hollow.’ By 1916 the multi-national residents of Hungary Hollow applied for and were granted an official name change to Lincoln Place.

Demographics

As of the census of 2010, there were 29,849 people, 12,214 households, and 7,791 families residing in the city. The population density was 1,547.5 people per square mile (597.5/km). The racial makeup of the city was 91.5% White, 6.5% Black or African American, 1.0% American Indian or Alaska Native (Native American), 0.8% Asian, 0.1% Pacific Islander, 2.3% from other races, and 2.1% from two or more races. Hispanic or Latino of any race were 5.0% of the population.

There were 12,214 households, out of which 27.1% had children under the age of 18 living with them, 42.4% were married couples living together, 15.4% had a female householder with no husband present, and 36.2% were non-families. 30.4% of all households were made up of householders living alone, and 13.0% had someone living alone who was 65 years of age or older. The average household size was 2.42 and the average family size was 3.

In the city the population age range was spread out, with 22.9% under the age of 18, 13.3% from 15 to 24, 26.2% from 25 to 44, 26.6% from 45 to 64, and 15% who were 65 years of age or older. The median age was 38.2 years. For every 100 females, there were 92.5 males. For every 100 females age 18 and over, there were 90.7 males.

The median income for a household in the city in 2014 was $43,759, and the median income for a family was $57,596. Males over age 16 had a median income of $46,390 versus $36,989 for females. The per capita income for the city was $22,397. About 14.8% of families and 18.3% of the population were below the poverty line, including 27.7% of those under age 18 and 7.2% of those age 65 or over.

Recreation

The Granite City Park District owns 13 parks. Wilson Park is the most notable. A  paved trail encircles the  park which contains a pool, ice rink, park office, skate park, food and beverage stand, tennis courts, several pavilions, baseball fields, and a wedding area. The Park District offers baseball, flag football, tennis, soccer, basketball, and hockey programs for the youth.

Every summer around July 4, Wilson Park hosts the Patriots in the Park program. The program includes live entertainment, carriage rides, carnival rides, food & beverage stands, and the second largest fireworks display in the St. Louis area.

Madison County Transit provides an outstanding  network of newly paved, well maintained bikeways throughout the county as well as Granite City.

The new YMCA, part of the River's Edge Development was recently completed. The complex includes aquatics programs, a youth center, weightlifting, batting cages, basketball/tennis courts, and a child care center.

There are also two golf courses near Granite City. The Legacy Golf Course and the Arlington Golf Course both offer eighteen hole championship courses.  Horseshoe Lake State Park wraps around Horseshoe Lake, a  natural lake, the largest lake in the St. Louis area. The park provides a place for picnicking, cycling, fishing, wildlife viewing, and small boating. Hunting is allowed during hunting season and a small primitive campground is located on Walker's Island.

There are 2 roller skating rinks in the area and Confluence Crush Roller Derby practices in the adjacent village of Pontoon Beach.

Transportation

Railroad service

The Port Harbor Railroad (reporting marks: PHRR) provides railroad service to industrial businesses located at America's Central Port in Granite City.  The PHRR connects with the Terminal Railroad Association of St. Louis at "WR Tower," a major railroad junction located at the intersection of Niedringhaus Avenue and 16th Street. The railway carries everything from steel and aluminum products to foods, lumber, paper, chemicals, minerals, grains and other products.

Education
Granite City Community Unit School District 9 enrolls 7100 students from the city and its surrounding area. The district operates five elementary schools (Frohardt, Mitchell, Wilson, Prather, and Maryville) One intermediate school (Grigsby) One Junior High (Coolidge) and one high school (Granite City High School (GCHS)). Recently, the high school underwent a 14 million dollar renovation. The district is notable for its wide array of sports, clubs, and technical programs. Recently, the track, baseball field, and high school gymnasium were renovated. The high school has achieved a 96.3% graduation rate, nearly 10% higher than the state average.  Granite City High School was the 1940 State champions in basketball.  Granite City High has won ten boys' soccer state championships in 1972, 1976–1980, 1982, 1987, 1989, and 1990, and the girls' soccer team won the 2011 state championship.  In addition, the Warrior wrestling team were co-champions in 1965 and currently have more dual meet victories than any other high school in the country. The baseball team were runners-up in 1963.

Two private Catholic K-8 schools, Holy Family and St. Elizabeth, are also located in the city.

Alternative schools include the Coordinated Youth on Madison Avenue next to the Gateway Regional Medical Center and attached to the same building as the WIC Service. Another Coordinated Youth location is on W 3rd St near the old army depot.

The Sam Wolf Granite City Campus (SWGCC) of Southwestern Illinois College is located at the northern end of the city.

Notable people 

 George Becker, American labor leader and president of the United Steelworkers
 John Bischoff, Major League Baseball catcher for Chicago White Sox and Boston Red Sox
 Harry Boyles, Major League Baseball pitcher for Chicago White Sox
 Glenn Bradford, Illinois politician and lawyer
 Robert Olen Butler, Pulitzer Prize-winning fiction writer
 Julie Curry, politician
 L. J. Fort, linebacker for NFL's Pittsburgh Steelers and Baltimore Ravens
 Owen Friend, former Major League Baseball second baseman for St. Louis Browns, Detroit Tigers, Cleveland Indians, Boston Red Sox and Chicago Cubs
 Andrew Goodpaster, former Supreme Allied Commander of NATO and Four Star U.S. Army General
 Kevin Greene, former National Football League linebacker
 Orville Hodge, politician
 Matt Hughes, former UFC welterweight champion
 Charlie Jackson, Major League Baseball outfielder for Chicago White Sox and Pittsburgh Pirates
 Robbie Lawler, former Elite XC middleweight champion
 Carl Linhart, baseball player 
 Dal Maxvill, former MLB shortstop, Gold Glove winner, and Cardinals general manager
 Ruben Mendoza, soccer player, two-time US Olympian, two-time US World Cup Team member
 Andy Phillip, basketball Hall of Fame
 Jason Robertson, AIDS activist whose family was forced to move out of town due to local harassment and bullying
 Kenneth Shaw, educator
 Ralph T. Smith, former Senator
Stephen Trittschuh, Major League Soccer (MISL, APSL, MLS) defender, member of the US Men's National Soccer Team
 Anna M. Valencia, Chicago City Clerk
 Whip Wilson, actor in Western films

References

Further reading
Granite City, A Pictorial History, 1896–1996. Granite City, Ill.: G. Bradley Publishing, 1995.

External links
City of Granite

 
Cities in Illinois
Cities in Madison County, Illinois
Company towns in Illinois
Illinois populated places on the Mississippi River
Populated places established in 1896
1896 establishments in Illinois
Sundown towns in Illinois